Old Order Anabaptism encompasses those groups which have preserved the old ways of Anabaptist Christian religion and lifestyle. 

Historically, an Old Order movement emerged in the second half of the 19th century among the Amish, Mennonites of South German and Swiss ancestry as well as the Schwarzenau Brethren and River Brethren in the United States and Canada. The Hutterites are additionally regarded as being Old Order Anabaptists, as they continued the practice of communal living. The Old Order movement led to several Old Order divisions from mainstream Anabaptist groups between 1845 and 1901. All Old Order Anabaptist groups that emerged after 1901 divided from established Old Order Anabaptist groups or were formed by people coming from different Old Order Anabaptist groups. 

Sandra L. Cronk writes about the Old Order Anabaptists:

By the close of the 20th century, there were over a quarter of a million Old Order Anabaptists in North America alone. Old Order Anabaptists enjoy a rich spiritual and community life, which has attracted seekers who desire to become church members of Old Order Anabaptist denominations.

Belief and practice

Old Order Anabaptist groups do not have seminary trained pastors and never developed written sophisticated theology.

The avoidance of technologies by Old Order Anabaptist communities is based not on a belief that the technology is in some way evil, but over a concern for the nature of their communities. Community is important to members of Old Order Anabaptist groups, and a technology or practice is rejected if it would adversely affect it. This means that the prohibitions are not usually absolute; a member who would not own a car may accept a ride in a car or other modern transport if a pressing need arises. This basis also means that most Old Orders see no contradiction in having electricity in their milking barn, since that is necessary to comply with regulations on milk cooling, but not in their house.

Other aspects of Old Order Anabaptist life are concerned with plainness, which dictates their distinctive dress. “Plain” to Old Orders is the opposite of showy, fancy or ostentatious, and is considered a virtue opposed to pridefulness, related to humility. It is based on the belief that a person's true worth is spiritual, and so does not lie in their clothes or appearance. The foundation of plain dress comes from the desire to obey the New Testament’s instructions against outward adornment and fashionable, expensive clothing.

Nonresistance and loving one’s enemies is a belief held by all Old Order groups.

According to Donald Kraybill and Carl Bowman the following additional practices are common among the Old Orders:

A capella singing
Believer's baptism
Excommunication
Fermented wine in communion
Foot washing
Holy Kiss
Kneeling for prayer
Multiple ministers lead in worship
Ordination of leaders by lot
Separation by gender during worship
Self-examination before communion

Dress
All Old Order Anabaptist groups dress Plain and all their forms of dress share the same roots in the Pennsylvania Quaker dress style.

Buggies and cars
All Old Order Amish groups are horse and buggy groups, including the New Order Amish. Among the Old Order Mennonites, there are both horse and buggy and car driving groups. The same is true for the Old Orders among the Schwarzenau Brethren. The Old Order River Brethren are a car driving group, except a small subgroup of about half a dozen members, that still use horse and buggy transportation. Old Order German Baptist Brethren are a group of 3 congregations in Ohio who still use horses and buggies, and do not have electricity in their homes.  The Hutterite groups are entirely car-driving.

Language
Almost all Old Order Amish groups speak a German dialect in every day life, either Pennsylvania German, or one of two Alemannic dialects (Swiss Amish), or in the case of the Hutterites—Hutterite German. Among the Old Order Mennonites, all horse and buggy groups, except the Virginia groups, speak Pennsylvania German. The car driving groups of Old Order Mennonites shifted to English in the second half of the 20th century. The groups from which the Old Order Schwarzenau Brethren and Old Order River Brethren split, had already started shifting to English in the 19th century and mostly completed it in the first half of the 20th century.

Demographics

There are about 350,000 Old Order Amish, 60,000 to 80,000 Old Order Mennonites, about 7,000 Old Order Brethren, about 350 Old Order River Brethren, and around 50,000 Hutterites. The Amish and Mennonite Old Orders have growth rates between 3 and 5 percent a year, in average about 3.7 percent. Old Order Schwarzenau and River Brethren groups in contrast have low growth rates and were even shrinking during the 20th century. All English speaking groups tend to grow much more slowly than their German speaking brothers.

Groups
The Old Order Anabaptists comprise the following groups:

Amish (selection of affiliations; there are some 40 major affiliations, partly with subgroups, and more than 100 unaffiliated congregations)
Nebraska Amish, the most conservative of all Old Order groups, emerged in 1881 as a split from the Byler Amish
Swartzentruber Amish, largest very conservative group, emerged between 1913–1917
Swiss Amish, two different groups, speak two different Alemannic dialects instead of Pennsylvania German
Buchanan Amish, most spread out affiliation, emerged in 1914
Andy Weaver Amish, relatively conservative, emerged in 1952
Troyer Amish, emerged in 1932 as a split from the Swartzentrubers
Byler Amish, a very early split, emerged in 1849 
Renno Amish, a quite conservative group, emerged in 1863
Holmes Old Order Amish, second largest Amish affiliation
Elkhart-LaGrange Amish, third largest Amish affiliation
Lancaster Amish, largest Amish affiliation, relatively liberal
Michigan Amish Churches, emerged in the 1970s, in many aspects similar to the New Order Amish
New Order Amish, emerged in the 1960s, the most liberal among the Amish Old Orders
Old Order Mennonites (groups with more than 300 members)
Groffdale Conference Mennonite Church, largest horse and buggy group, emerged 1927 in Pennsylvania as a split from the Weaverland Mennonite Conference
Weaverland Mennonite Conference, largest car driving group, emerged in 1893, allowed cars in the mid 1920s
Ontario Mennonite Conference, largest horse and buggy group in Canada, emerged 1889
Markham-Waterloo Mennonite Conference, largest car driving group in Canada, emerged 1939 as a division from the Ontario Mennonite Conference
Stauffer Mennonite, oldest Old Order group, emerged in 1845
Ohio-Indiana Mennonite Conference, emerged in 1872, now a car driving group 
Orthodox Mennonites, emerged in 1958, a merger of several very conservative groups
Noah Hoover Mennonite, emerged in 1963 through a long process that started in 1940s, concerning technology the most restricted of all groups
David Martin Mennonites, emerged in 1917, the most isolated from other Old Order groups, do not talk about their belief with outsiders
Virginia Old Order Mennonite Conference, emerged in 1901, the latest Old Order split from a mainstream group
Reidenbach Old Order Mennonites, emerged in 1942 as a split from the Groffdale Conference, divided in very small endogamous subgroups
John Dan Wenger Mennonites, emerged in 1952/53 as a split from the Virginia Old Order Mennonites
Schwarzenau Brethren
 Old German Baptist Brethren, emerged 1881, the largest Old Order group of the Schwarzenau Brethren and more liberal than the following three groups
 Old Brethren, emerged 1913, a bit more conservative than the Old German Baptist Brethren but in many aspects similar to them
 Old Order German Baptist Brethren, emerged 1921, a horse and buggy group that uses tractors for field work 
 Old Brethren German Baptists, emerged 1939, a horse and buggy group that uses horses also for field work, the most conservative group
 Old German Baptist Brethren, New Conference, emerged 2009, a more liberal split from the Old German Baptist Brethren
Old Order River Brethren, emerged 1856, divided in three subgroups, mostly car driving, the only Old Orders among the River Brethren.
Hutterites
Lehrerleut, the most traditional of the Hutterite groups that emerged in 1877
Schmiedeleut, Hutterite group emerging in 1859
Dariusleut, a branch of the Hutterites that emerged in 1860
 Para-Amish groups
 Believers in Christ, Lobelville, emerged in 1973 when members of different Old Order groups formed a new one
 Vernon Community, Hestand, emerged in 1996 as a split from the Believers in Christ, Lobelville
 Caneyville Christian Community, emerged in 2004 when members of different Old Order groups formed a new one

See also 

Conservative Anabaptists

References

Anabaptism
Amish
Mennonitism
Old Order Mennonites